Saint-Ouen-des-Champs is a former commune in the Eure department, Normandy, northern France. On 1 January 2019, it was merged into the new commune Le Perrey.

Population

See also
Communes of the Eure department

References

Former communes of Eure